Dirophanes is a genus of parasitoid wasps belonging to the family Ichneumonidae.

The species of this genus are found in Europe and Northern America.

Species:
 Dirophanes anoukae Hower, 2006 
 Dirophanes benjamini Hower, 2006

References

Ichneumonidae
Ichneumonidae genera